The 1973 Pacific Southwest Open was a men's tennis tournament played on outdoor hard courts at the Los Angeles Tennis Center in Los Angeles, California in the United States. The tournament was classified as Grade A and was part of the Grand Prix tennis circuit. It was the 47th edition of the tournament and ran from September 17 through September 23, 1973. Jimmy Connors won the singles title and the $11,000 first place prize money.

Finals

Singles

 Jimmy Connors defeated  Tom Okker 7–5, 7–6(11–9)
 It was Connors' 9th singles title of the year and the 15th of his career.

Doubles

 Jan Kodeš /  Vladimír Zedník defeated  Jimmy Connors /  Ilie Năstase 6–2, 6–4

References

External links
 ITF tournament edition details

Los Angeles Open (tennis)
Pacific Southwest Open
Pacific Southwest Open
Pacific Southwest Open
Pacific Southwest Open